Raisting is a municipality  in the Weilheim-Schongau district, in Bavaria, Germany.

Sport
The towns association football club SV Raisting, formed in 1924, experienced its greatest success in 2013 when it won promotion to the southern division of the Bayernliga for the first time.

Science 
The town is home to Germany's first satellite ground station, Raisting Earth Station.

Transport
The town has a railway station, on the Mering–Weilheim line.

References

Weilheim-Schongau